Nestor Osvaldo Grindetti is an Argentine actuary and politician.

He was Minister of Finance of the Autonomous City of Buenos Aires from 2007 to 2015, before becoming mayor of Lanús, an industrial city south of Buenos Aires.

References

External links

Living people
People named in the Panama Papers
Mayors of places in Argentina
Year of birth missing (living people)